Stephen Oliver or Steven Oliver may refer to:
 Stephen Oliver (actor) (1941–2008), American actor
 Stephen Oliver (bishop) (born 1948), Anglican bishop of Stepney
 Stephen Oliver (composer) (1950–1992), British composer
 Stephen Oliver (judge) (born 1938), British civil servant and Q.C.
 Stephen Oliver (Jr), pseudonym of author William Andrew Chatto (1799–1864)
 Stephen Oliver (scientist) (born 1949), professor at the University of Cambridge
 Steve Oliver (born 1962), American musician
 Steven Oliver (footballer) (born 1971), Australian rules footballer
Steven Oliver (Australian actor), Indigenous Australian actor/writer, known for Black Comedy

See also